Ring finger protein 24  is a protein that in humans is encoded by the RNF24 gene.

RNF24 binds TRPC6 (603652) and other transient receptor potential cation channel (TRPC) family members and is involved in regulation of intracellular trafficking of TRPCs. In addition, RNF24 contains similarity to the Drosophila goliath protein and thus may function as a transcription factor.

References

Further reading

RING finger proteins